Dolichoderus brevicornis is a species of ant in the genus Dolichoderus. Described by Dlussky in 2002, remains of the species were discovered in the Baltic Amber.

References

†
Eocene insects
Prehistoric insects of Europe
Fossil taxa described in 2002
Fossil ant taxa
Rovno amber